Matthew Smith (also spelled Mathew Smith; 1734 – July 22, 1794), was a Pennsylvania politician.

He served briefly as Vice-President of Pennsylvania (a position analogous to the modern office of lieutenant governor) following the resignation of George Bryan on 11 October 1779. Smith was elected and took office that same day and served until his own resignation on 23 October 1779. At twelve days, Smith's was the shortest tenure of the ten men who served as vice-president under the Commonwealth's 1776 Constitution—in fact, his was the shortest term of any governor or lieutenant governor in the history of the Commonwealth. (John Bell served as governor for fourteen days in January 1947, and David Redick held the vice-presidency for twenty two days in the fall of 1788.)  As was the case with his predecessor, no reason is given for his resignation in the minutes of the Council. By virtue of his office, Smith served as an ex officio member of the Board of Trustees of the University of Pennsylvania for a similarly brief period, October–November 1779.

References

Lieutenant Governors of Pennsylvania
University of Pennsylvania
1734 births
1794 deaths